Al-Bakri is a small lunar impact crater on the northwest edge of Mare Tranquillitatis. It is named after the Spanish Arab geographer and historian Abu Abdullah al-Bakri. It is just south of the eastern arm of the Montes Haemus that borders the Mare Serenitatis to the north. To the east-northeast is the prominent crater Plinius. South of the crater are the rilles of the Rimae Maclear.

Al-Bakri was designated Tacquet A prior to being assigned a name by the IAU. The tiny Tacquet lies to the northwest on the Mare Serenitatis.

References

External links

Al-Bakri at The Moon Wiki

Impact craters on the Moon